Mahesh Bhupathi and Max Mirnyi were the defending champions but lost in the quarterfinals to Gastón Etlis and Martín Rodríguez.

Tim Henman and Nenad Zimonjić won in the final 7–5, 6–2 against Etlis and Rodríguez.

Seeds
All eight seeded teams received byes to the second round.

Draw

Finals

Top half

Bottom half

References
 2004 Monte Carlo Masters Doubles Draw

2004 Monte Carlo Masters
Doubles